The Eastern Pinnacle Peak is a mountain peak that rests in the middle of the cluster of peaks around Thajiwas Area of Sonamarg. In its vicinity, there are famous peaks of Kashmir like Valehead Peak and Umbrella Peak. The Eastern Pinnacle Peak was first scaled by J.A. Jackson, a famous English mountaineer and explorer, in 1945.

The peak was not summited again until 12 July 2020 when a group of Kashmiri Mountaineers belonging to Cliffhangers India summited it. The group was led by Mohammed Arif, the founder of Cliffhangers India, Junaid Ahmed, Nazir Raina and Nazir Jr.

References 

Geography of Ganderbal district
Mountains of Jammu and Kashmir